Jelena Vujadinović (born 17 November 2000) is a Montenegrin footballer who plays as a stryker and has appeared for the Montenegro women's national team.

Career
Vujadinović has been capped for the Montenegro national team, appearing for the team during the UEFA Women's Euro 2021 qualifying cycle.

International goals

References

External links
 
 
 

2000 births
Living people
Montenegrin women's footballers
Montenegro women's international footballers
Women's association football midfielders
ŽFK Breznica players